Clive Barker's A-Z of Horror was a documentary series first broadcast on BBC2 in 1997. It was written and hosted by Clive Barker and explored the history of horror, from the cinema to art. A tie-in book was released featuring art work by Barker and film reviews by Stephen Jones.

Subjects included:
Grand Guignol
Edgar Allan Poe
Tom Savini
George A. Romero
H. P. Lovecraft
Ed Gein
Franz Xaver Messerschmidt
Freddy Krueger

Book
Clive Barker's A-Z of Horror, compiled by Stephen Jones, BBC Books, 1997, .

External links
 The A to Z of Horror on Clive Barker's website
 

BBC television documentaries
British horror fiction television series
Works by Clive Barker
1997 British television series debuts
1997 British television series endings
1990s British horror television series
1990s British documentary television series
English-language television shows